Heraldic fraud may mean either to falsely claim the right to a coat of arms (or other component of heraldic display) for oneself, or to falsely assert that someone else has that right in order to sell heraldic art to them. Both can be seen as a kind of fraud and an infringement of intellectual property rights.

According to the law of arms in most heraldic jurisdictions, usage of a pre-existing coat of arms must be predicated on some form of family relationship. Typically, inheritance of arms flows through the male line, though in many traditions it may flow through the female line as well.

The term "bucket shop" is sometimes used to refer to a company that will sell a coat of arms (often referred to by the misnomer "family crest") associated with the customer's surname, regardless of whether the customer can actually claim a relation to the original armiger. Bucket shops may work from a database of surnames and shields sourced from manuscripts, armorials, and various journals. A common indicator of "bucket shop" arms is the display of the surname within what should be the motto scroll.

See also
High Court of Chivalry
Lord Lyon King of Arms

References

Further reading
 "The Privileges of the College of Arms (Concluded)". The Genealogical Magazine, Volume 5. pp. 103–106. Elliot Stock., 1902.

Heraldry and law
Genealogical fraud
Fraud